Glénat can refer to:

 Glénat, Cantal, a commune in the Cantal département, France
 Glénat Editions, a French publisher, specialising in comics and manga